The family Hepialidae comprises the "swift moths", of which five occur in Great Britain:

 Hepialus humuli, ghost moth ‡* — vulnerable
 Hepialus humuli humuli — throughout
 Hepialus humuli thulensis — Shetland Isles
 Hepialus sylvina, orange swift — throughout
 Hepialus hecta, gold swift — throughout (local)
 Hepialus lupulinus, common swift — throughout
 Hepialus fusconebulosa, map-winged swift — throughout (local)

Species listed in the 2007 UK Biodiversity Action Plan (BAP) are indicated by a double-dagger symbol (‡)—species so listed for research purposes only are also indicated with an asterisk (‡*).

See also
List of moths of Great Britain (overview)
Family lists: Hepialidae, Cossidae, Zygaenidae, Limacodidae, Sesiidae, Lasiocampidae, Saturniidae, Endromidae, Drepanidae, Thyatiridae, Geometridae, Sphingidae, Notodontidae, Thaumetopoeidae, Lymantriidae, Arctiidae, Ctenuchidae, Nolidae, Noctuidae and Micromoths

References 

 Waring, Paul, Martin Townsend and Richard Lewington (2003) Field Guide to the Moths of Great Britain and Ireland. British Wildlife Publishing, Hook, UK. .

Moths
Britain